Tim Whelan (November 2, 1893 – August 12, 1957) was an American film director, writer, producer and actor best remembered for his writing credits on Harold Lloyd and Harry Langdon comedies, and his directing of mostly British films (e.g.The Thief of Bagdad (1940). 

Whelan died at his home in Beverly Hills.

Selected filmography

 Safety Last! (1923)
 Why Worry? (1923)
 Girl Shy (1924)
 Hot Water (1924)
 The Freshman (1925)
 Tramp, Tramp, Tramp (1926)
 The Strong Man (1926)
 Exit Smiling (1926)
 My Best Girl (1927)
 Adam's Apple (1928)
 When Knights Were Bold (1929)
 The Fall Guy (1930)
 The Crooked Circle (1932)
 Girl Crazy (1932)
 It's a Boy (1933)
 Aunt Sally (1933)
 The Camels are Coming (1934)
 The Murder Man (1935)
 The Perfect Gentleman (1935)
 Two's Company (1936)
 Farewell Again (1937)
 Action for Slander (1937)
 Smash and Grab (1937)
 The Mill on the Floss (1937)
 The Divorce of Lady X (1938)
 Sidewalks of London (1938)
 Q Planes (1939)
 The Thief of Bagdad (1940)
 The Mad Doctor (1941)
 International Lady (1941)
 Seven Days' Leave (1942)
 Swing Fever (1943)
 Step Lively (1944)
 This Was a Woman (1948)
 Rage at Dawn (1955)

References

External links
 
 

1893 births
1957 deaths
People from Cannelton, Indiana
Film directors from Indiana
American male screenwriters
Male actors from Indiana
Screenwriters from Indiana
20th-century American male writers
20th-century American screenwriters